Plastic Tree are a Japanese alternative rock band. Formed in December 1993 in Chiba Prefecture, they released their first mini-album in December 1995, and in 1997, they released their first single on a major label.

History

Biography

In 1995, they released their first mini-album Kimyou na Kajitsu: Strange Fruits after changing drummers twice. Two years later, they released their first single, "Wareta Mado", with Warner Music Japan, their first release on a major label.

Plastic Tree made their first overseas tour in 2006, named the Chandelier Tour, and performed concerts in France, Germany and Finland.

On February 23, 2009, Hiroshi Sasabuchi announced his resignation as the band's drummer after having been with the band for seven years. On July 3, 2009, Kenken Sato was announced as the band's new drummer. Since forming, the band has had four drummers.

Sound and style
Early in their career, their music had heavy visual kei influences. As time went on, their sound seemed to change and evolve with every album. Plastic Tree combine alternative rock with art rock, electronic, and heavy metal. Their sound is a blend of raw melody, with the occasional orchestral backing track. However, the band does not think that they should be placed into any specific genre. Plastic Tree claim that their sound has been considerably influenced by British bands such as Radiohead and The Cure.

The most easily recognizable signature of Plastic Tree's music is the melodic, childlike voice of Ryūtarō Arimura. Their sound is also aided by Arimura's abstract lyrics. All four band members collaborate to write songs and lyrics, with Arimura writing most of the lyrics.

Band members

Current members

Former members

Discography

Singles

Albums

Mini albums

"Best of" albums

Other albums

DVD

In popular culture
 "Sink" was used as the eighth ending song for the anime Kindaichi Case Files.
 "Namida Drop" was used as the first ending song for the anime Garasu no Kantai.
 "Mirai Iro" was used as the fifth ending song for the anime Yu-Gi-Oh! 5D's.
 "Silent Noise" was used as the opening song for the Visual novel Collar_×_Malice.

References

External links

 Official website
 Official blog

Japanese alternative rock groups
Visual kei musical groups
Musical groups from Chiba Prefecture
Tokuma Japan Communications artists
CJ Victor Entertainment artists